Huntington Beach High School (HBHS) is a public high school in Huntington Beach, California. Built in 1906, it is part of the Huntington Beach Union High School District. HBHS is a California Distinguished School. Huntington Beach High School is also the home of the Huntington Beach Academy for the Performing Arts.

Campus

Huntington Beach High School bell tower and auditorium were originally built in 1903 and were rebuilt in 1926.
In July 2009, renovations were completed on the auditorium and the bell tower. Construction was also completed on the school's performing arts classrooms building and courtyard. The project was funded through taxes.

Sports

The school competes in the Sunset League.  In 2006 the school moved to the Sea View League (which consisted of Huntington Beach, El Toro, Foothill, Woodbridge, Northwood, and Trabuco Hills) from the Sunset League, but moved back to the Sunset League in 2009. The Sunset League now contains Huntington Beach, Edison, Newport Harbor, Fountain Valley, Marina, and Los Alamitos.

The Huntington Beach High School Men's Varsity Volleyball Team currently holds the national record of 121 consecutive wins.

Notable alumni

Athletes
Robert August, Pro Surfer and Film Maker
Collin Balester, Pitcher for MLB's Washington Nationals
Corky Carroll, Pro Surfer
Howie Clark, Professional baseball player
Hank Conger, Catcher for MLB's Tampa Bay Rays
Noah Davis (nicknamed Diesel; born 1997), pitcher for MLB's Colorado Rockies
Dennis Hamilton, Professional basketball player
Greg Knapp, Professional football coach 
Courtenay Stewart, 2004 Olympian
Jim Dedrick, Pitcher for MLB's Baltimore Orioles
Tony Gonzalez, Pro Football Hall of Fame tight end
Jack Haley, basketball player with Los Angeles Lakers and Chicago Bulls
Sacha Kljestan, Midfielder for MLS's Chivas U.S.A. and R.S.C.Anderlecht.
Drew McAthy, professional soccer player
Brett Simpson, Pro Surfer
Nick Pratto, Professional Baseball Player, Kansas City Royals
Lauren Powers, Professional bodybuilder and fitness icon
Paul McBeth, Professional disc golfer
Torey Defalco, Professional indoor volleyball player 
Joshua Tuaniga, Professional indoor volleyball player
Kanoa Igarashi, Professional surfer and Olympian
Alex Wolf (water polo), Professional water polo player and 2020 Olympian

Art and media
Beth Broderick, actor
MADSTEEZ (Mark Paul Deren), artist
 Brent Rivera, internet personality and actor
Mary Beth Evans Actor
 Kyle Selig, Broadway actor
 Chrissy Teigen, model and television personality

Elected officials
Matthew Harper, California State Assemblyman and former Huntington Beach Mayor

Government officials
Tito Ortiz, professional mixed martial artist and former Mayor pro tempore of Huntington Beach
Amanda Simpson, Executive Director of US Army Energy Initiatives Task Force, Obama Administration

Musicians
Dallas Cook, Former trombone player for Suburban Legends
Brian Robertson, Trombone player for Suburban Legends
Keaton Stromberg,  bass guitar, vocals, back up guitar for Emblem3
Chad Wackerman, former Drummer and Percussionist for Frank Zappa
Hellogoodbye, rock band
M. Shadows, Founder and Singer of Avenged Sevenfold
Dria, Composer, Singer, 1/2 of The Frontrunnaz
Cameron Lew, singer-songwriter, instrumentalist, and founder of Ginger Root (music project)

References

External links
School website
The Academy for the Performing Arts

Educational institutions established in 1906
High schools in Orange County, California
Education in Huntington Beach, California
Buildings and structures in Huntington Beach, California
Public high schools in California
1906 establishments in California